Stillness is an album by Sérgio Mendes and the Brasil '66 band.

Track listing
"Stillness" (Paula Stone) – 2:40
"Righteous Life" (Paula Stone) – 3:15
"Chelsea Morning" (Joni Mitchell) – 2:56
"Canção Do Nosso Amor" (Silveira, Medeiros) – 3:46
"Viramundo" (Gilberto Gil, José Carlos Capinam) – 3:02
"Lost in Paradise" (Caetano Veloso) – vocals by Gracinha Leporace – 3:43
"For What It's Worth" (Stephen Stills) – 3:36
"Sometimes in Winter" (Steve Katz) – 4:43
"Celebration of the Sunrise" (instrumental) (Sebastião Neto, Oscar Castro Neves) – 1:45
"Stillness (reprise)" (Paula Stone) – 1:28

References

1970 albums
Sérgio Mendes albums
Albums produced by Sérgio Mendes
Albums produced by Herb Alpert
A&M Records albums